Bulfinch is an Irish American surname. Notable people with the surname include:

 Charles Bulfinch (1763–1830), American architect
 Thomas Bulfinch (1796–1867), American writer best known as author of Bulfinch's Mythology

See also
Bullfinch (disambiguation)